Roy Edward Conroy (October 21, 1946 – June 26, 2020) was a Canadian politician who served as Member of the Legislative Assembly (MLA) for Rossland-Trail in the Canadian province of British Columbia from 1991 to 2001. He was a member of the British Columbia New Democratic Party (BC NDP).

Conroy was born in Rossland, British Columbia and raised in Castlegar, where he attended Stanley Humphries Secondary School and Selkirk College. He studied political science and philosophy at the University of Victoria, then moved back to the Kootenays, briefly working at a pulp mill before getting hired by a saw mill to work on a towboat. He also raised purebred cattle. He was elected trustee for School District 9 in 1986, at one point serving as the board's vice-chair.

He was first elected to the Legislative Assembly of British Columbia in the 1991 provincial election, then won re-election in 1996. Under the ruling NDP, he served as government caucus chair from June 1996 to October 1997, then from March to November 2000. He also acted as parliamentary secretary to the Minister of Agriculture, Food and Fisheries and Minister of Transportation and Highways. Under Premier Ujjal Dosanjh, Conroy served as Minister of Agriculture, Food and Fisheries and Minister Responsible for Rural Development between November 2000 and June 2001.

He contested the newly constituted riding of West Kootenay-Boundary in the 2001 provincial election; with the NDP deeply unpopular within the province, he lost to Liberal candidate Sandy Santori.

He had two children with former partner Gwen Jones, then married Katrine Conroy ( Thor-Larsen) in 1981, with whom he had two more children. Katrine Conroy is the current MLA for the redistributed district of Kootenay West; she has served in the provincial cabinets of Premiers John Horgan and David Eby. He died at the age of 73 on June 26, 2020, from complications from surgery after sustaining a broken hip.

References

1946 births
2020 deaths
20th-century Canadian legislators
21st-century Canadian legislators
British Columbia New Democratic Party MLAs
Canadian ranchers
Members of the Executive Council of British Columbia
University of Victoria alumni
Spouses of Canadian politicians